The Afghan Ministry of Information and Culture is the Afghan Government Ministry in charge of Culture, Tourism, Publishing Affairs and Youth Affairs. The ministry is currently led by Khairullah Khairkhwa.

Ministers

References

External links
 Official Website Ministry of Information and Culture

Information and culture
Afghanistan
Afghanistan